Clap Hands! Here Comes Rosie! is a 1960 studio album by Rosemary Clooney, arranged by Bob Thompson and released by RCA Victor. The album earned Clooney a 1961 Grammy Award nomination for Best Female Vocal Performance (Album), but she lost to Ella Fitzgerald for Ella in Berlin: Mack the Knife.

Track listing 
 "Clap Hands! Here Comes Rosie!"/"Everything's Coming up Rosie" (Ballard MacDonald, Joseph Meyer, Billy Rose)/(Stephen Sondheim, Jule Styne) – 2:20
 "Give Me the Simple Life" (Rube Bloom, Harry Ruby) – 2:33
 "Bye Bye Blackbird" (Mort Dixon, Ray Henderson) – 2:43
 "Aren't You Glad You're You?" (Johnny Burke, Jimmy Van Heusen) – 2:17
 "You Got" (Bernard) – 2:44
 "Too Marvelous for Words" (Johnny Mercer, Richard Whiting) – 2:10
 "Something's Gotta Give" (Mercer) – 2:20
 "Hooray for Love" (Harold Arlen, Leo Robin) – 2:26
 "Mean to Me" (Fred E. Ahlert, Roy Turk) – 3:36
 "Oh, What a Beautiful Mornin'" (Oscar Hammerstein II, Richard Rodgers) – 2:14
 "It Could Happen to You" (Burke, Van Heusen) – 2:30
 "Makin' Whoopee" (Walter Donaldson, Gus Kahn) – 3:16

Personnel

Performance 
 Rosemary Clooney – vocal
 Bob Thompson – arranger, conductor

References 

1960 albums
Rosemary Clooney albums
Albums arranged by Bob Thompson (musician)
RCA Victor albums
Albums conducted by Bob Thompson (musician)